The Samans, is a Chinese metal band that was formed at 2007 in Changchun, Jilin. Currently it has six members, Lifu Wang (lead vocals), Yaxin Gao (programme/samples), Zhichao Ren (guitar), Xiaoyu Zhai (guitar), Chenglin Ji (drums), and Ji Qi (bass). The name of their band is from their five members' (those who from Northeast of China and Inner Mongolia Region) religion. The member chose to use "The Samans" as their band's English name instead of "Shaman" because they insist it does not spell like that in their national language. Most of their songs are in English.

Career
On August 4, 2011, The Samans performed in Ocean Midi Festival, Rizhao, Shan.

On April 29, 2012, The Samans performed in Beijing Midi Festival, Beijing.

Musical style and influences
The band started as a two-man electronic band with nu-breakbeat style. In 2007 they officially appeared on the stage, meanwhile their music style change from nu-breakbeat and EBM with some metal elements to industrial metal and alternative metal. They have incorporated melodic death metal and folk metal elements into their music, most notably through the use of flutes, and whistles.

They are influenced by industrial metal bands like Rammstein, KMFDM, Deathstars and Neue Deutsche Haerte.

Lyrics 
Most of the lyrics of the Samans are from their lead vocalist Lifu Wang.

Discography

Studio album & EPs 
 Weltreich (EP) (2009)
 Khan (EP) (2011)
 Whalesong (EP) (2012)
 Lionheart (EP) (2013)
 Saga×Monologue (Double album) (2021)

Singles 
 Silent Planet (2008)
 Death March (2008)
 Moths To The Flame We Are (2009)
 Attila (2009)
 The Marines (2009)
 Snowblind

References

External links
  The Samans' at Bandcamp.com (first album only, free download)
 The Samans at Douban.com

2007 establishments in China
Industrial metal musical groups
Melodic death metal musical groups
Chinese folk metal musical groups